Santa Cruz District may refer to:

 Peru:
 Santa Cruz District, Alto Amazonas, in Alto Amazonas province, Loreto region
 Santa Cruz District, Cutervo, in Cutervo province, Cajamarca region
 Santa Cruz District, Huaylas, in Huaylas province, Ancash region
 Santa Cruz District, Palpa, in Palpa province, Ica region
 Santa Cruz District, Santa Cruz, in Santa Cruz province, Cajamarca region
 Santa Cruz de Andamarca District, in Huaral province, Lima region
 Santa Cruz de Chuca District, in Santiago de Chuco province, La Libertad region
 Santa Cruz de Cocachacra District, in Huarochirí province, Lima region
 Santa Cruz de Flores District, in Cañete province, Lima region
 Santa Cruz de Toledo District, in Contumazá province, Cajamarca region
 Costa Rica:
 Santa Cruz District, León Cortés Castro, in León Cortés canton, San José province
 Santa Cruz District, Santa Cruz, Guanacaste, in Santa Cruz canton, Guanacaste province
 Santa Cruz District, Turrialba, in Turrialba canton, Cartago province

See also
 Santa Cruz (disambiguation)